Flavopunctelia is a genus of foliose lichens in the family Parmeliaceae. The genus contains species that are widespread in temperate and tropical areas. The genus is characterised by broad, yellow-green lobes, point-like (punctiform) pseudocyphellae on the thallus surface, and bifusiform conidia (i.e., threadlike with a swelling at both ends). All species contain usnic acid as a major secondary chemical in the cortex. Flavopunctelia was originally conceived as a subgenus of Punctelia by Hildur Krog in 1982; Mason Hale promoted it to generic status in 1984.

Species
Flavopunctelia borrerioides 
Flavopunctelia darrowii 
Flavopunctelia flaventior 
Flavopunctelia lobulata 
Flavopunctelia praesignis 
Flavopunctelia soredica

References

Lichen genera
Lecanorales genera
Taxa described in 1982
Taxa named by Hildur Krog